Ethics and Information Technology is a quarterly peer-reviewed scientific journal covering the intersection between moral philosophy and the field of information and communications technology. It was established in 1999 by Jeroen van den Hoven (Delft University of Technology), who has been its editor-in-chief ever since. It is published by Springer Science+Business Media. According to the Journal Citation Reports, the journal has a 2016 impact factor of 1.500.

References

External links

Springer Science+Business Media academic journals
Publications established in 1999
English-language journals
Computer science journals
Information ethics
Ethics journals
Quarterly journals